Aubin Olivier was a French engineer who introduced use of the screw press coin minting technique to France.  To reform French coinage, Henri II sent Olivier to investigate press technology being used by an Augsburg goldsmith. Olivier subsequently established the Royal Mill Mint on the Île de la Cité in Paris.

See also
 History of mints
 Jean Varin

References

French engineers
Year of death unknown
Year of birth unknown